Caulnes (Gallo: Caunn) is a commune in the Côtes-d'Armor department of Brittany in northwestern France.

Geography

Climate
Caulnes has a oceanic climate (Köppen climate classification Cfb).

Population

Inhabitants of Caulnes are called Caulnais in French.

See also
Communes of the Côtes-d'Armor department

References

External links

Official website  

Communes of Côtes-d'Armor